Bet Bet railway station is a disused railway station on the Mildura railway line. It is located in the small town of Bet Bet, Victoria. It was opened in 1874, in 1922 it gained a ballast Siding to the east of the station. Bet Bet was closed in 1981 and demolished sometime in the late 80s.

References 

Disused railway stations in Victoria (Australia)